This is a list of years in Costa Rica.

21st century

20th century

 
History of Costa Rica
Costa Rica
Years